The In Sound may refer to:

 The In Sound (Eddie Harris album), 1965 jazz album released on Atlantic Records
 The In Sound (Gary McFarland album), 1965 jazz album released on Verve Records